The Texarkana Symphony Orchestra is a non-profit performing arts initiative in Texarkana, Arkansas, conducted by Marc-André Bougie.  Its president is Remica Grey.

The orchestra was originally created as a non-profit organization consisting of 34 musicians and gave its first performance in April 2006, but has since expanded to 60 professionals covering a wide range of ages.  Most performances are given in the Perot Theatre.

The orchestra has also expanded creating the Texarkana Youth Symphony Orchestra who gave their debut concert in December 2007.  The Youth Orchestra is open to middle and high school students between the ages of 10 and 19.

External links
 http://www.texarkanasymphony.org

References

American orchestras
Musical groups from Arkansas
Performing arts in Arkansas
Texarkana, Arkansas
Musical groups established in 2006